This is a timeline documenting events of Jazz in the year 1992.

Events

April
 10 – The 19th Vossajazz started in Voss, Norway (April 10 – 12).

May
 20 – The 20th Nattjazz started in Bergen, Norway (May 20 – 31).

June
 5 – The 21st Moers Festival started in Moers, Germany (June 5 – 8).

July
 2 – 26th Montreux Jazz Festival started in Switzerland (July 2 – 18).
 10 – The 17th North Sea Jazz Festival started in The Hague (July 10 – 12).

August
 13 – The 9th Brecon Jazz Festival started in Brecon, Wales (April 13 – 15).

September
 18 – The 35th Monterey Jazz Festival started in Monterey, California (September 18 – 20).

Album releases

Jane Ira Bloom: Art and Aviation
Maria Schneider: Evanescence
Geri Allen: Maroons
Wynton Marsalis: Citi Movement
Joe Lovano: Universal Language
Terence Blanchard: The Malcolm X Jazz Suite
Sergey Kuryokhin: Some Combination of Fingers and Passion
Medeski Martin & Wood: Notes From the Underground
Courtney Pine: To The Eyes Of Creation
Hank Roberts: Little Motor People
Zeena Parkins: Ursa's Door
Steve Turre: Sanctified Shells
Pat Metheny: Secret Story
Charles Gayle: Repent
Michael Formanek: Loose Cannon
Franz Koglmann: L'Heure Bleue
Bill Frisell: Have a Little Faith
Michael Mantler: Folly Seeing All This
Bill Frisell: This Land
Kenny Wheeler: Kayak
Chick Corea & Bobby McFerrin: Play
Aydin Esen: Anadolu
Christy Doran: Corporate Art
Hal Russell: Hal's Bells
Joachim Kuhn: Dynamics
John Scofield: What We Do
Mulgrew Miller: Hand In Hand
Paul Plimley: When Silence Pulls
Ray Anderson: Every One of Us
Uri Caine: Sphere Music
Sonny Simmons: Ancient Ritual
John Pizzarelli: All of Me
Roy Campbell: New Kingdom
David S. Ware: Flight of I
Matthew Shipp: Circular Temple
Eliane Elias: Fantasia
Hugh Masekela: Beatin' Aroun de Bush
Yellowjackets: Live Wires

Deaths

 January
 17 – Charlie Ventura, American tenor saxophonist and bandleader (born 1916).

 February
 8 – Denny Wright, English guitarist (born 1924).

 March
 4 – Mary Osborne, American guitarist (born 1921).
 6 – Hugh Gibb, English drummer and bandleader (born 1916).

 April
 14 – Sammy Price, American pianist and bandleader (born 1908).
 20 – Leon Abramson or Lee Abrams, American drummer (born 1925).

 June
 10 – Hachidai Nakamura, Japanese songwriter and pianist (born 1931).

 August
 1 – Alfred "Chico" Alvarez, American trumpeter (born 1920).
 11 – Hayes Pillars, American tenor saxophonist and bandleader (born 1906).

 October
 3 – John Carisi, American trumpeter and composer (born 1922).
 7 – Ed Blackwell, American drummer (born 1929).

 November 
 8 – Red Mitchell, American upright bassist (born 1927).
 14 – George Adams, American saxophonist (born 1940).
 24 – June Tyson, American singer (born 1926).

 December
 11 – Andy Kirk, American saxophonist and tubist (born 1898).

Births 

 January
 17 – Kristian B. Jacobsen, Norwegian bassist and composer.

 March
 5 – Oddrun Lilja Jonsdottir, Icelandic/Norwegian guitarist, singer, and composer.
 6 – Lukas Zabulionis, Norwegian saxophonist and composer.
 15 – Elisabeth Lid Trøen, Norwegian saxophonist.
 17 – Alf Hulbækmo, Norwegian pianist.

 April
 6 – Mathias Stubø, Norwegian electronica artist.

 October
 1 – Gismo Graf, German guitarist and composer.

 December
 10 – Vincent Ingala, American saxophonist. 

 Unknown date
 Axel Skalstad, Norwegian drummer.
 Siril Malmedal Hauge, Norwegian singer, composer and band leader.

See also

 1990s in jazz
 List of years in jazz
 1992 in music

References

External links 
 History Of Jazz Timeline: 1992 at All About Jazz

Jazz
Jazz by year